Juglans insularis is a species of plant in the Juglandaceae family. It is endemic to Cuba.  It is threatened by habitat loss.

References

Flora of Cuba
insularis
Vulnerable plants
Taxonomy articles created by Polbot